Juan Manuel "Juanma" Bravo Alcántara (born 10 February 1998) is a Spanish professional footballer who plays as a central midfielder for AD Alcorcón.

Club career
Born in Cabezo de Torres, Murcia, Bravo joined Real Murcia's youth setup from CA Cabezo de Torres. Promoted to the reserves for the 2015–16 season, he made his senior debut on 30 August 2015 by starting in a 1–2 Tercera División home loss against CAP Ciudad de Murcia.

Bravo scored his first senior goal on 6 September 2015, netting his team's first in a 2–3 loss at EDMF Churra. On 24 March 2017, he renewed his contract until 2021.

Bravo made his first team debut on 9 April 2017, starting in a 3–1 home win against Atlético Mancha Real in the Segunda División B. His first goal in the main squad occurred on 24 February 2019, netting his team's only in a 1–2 loss at San Fernando CD.

On 1 September 2020, Bravo signed a four-year contract with Segunda División side AD Alcorcón. He made his professional debut on 13 September, coming on as a second-half substitute for fellow debutant Ander Gorostidi in a 0–0 away draw against CD Mirandés.

References

External links

1998 births
Living people
Footballers from Murcia
Spanish footballers
Association football midfielders
Segunda División players
Segunda División B players
Tercera División players
Real Murcia Imperial players
Real Murcia players
AD Alcorcón footballers